The Adventure of the Peerless Peer is a 1974 adventure pastiche novel written by Philip Jose Farmer, writing as Dr. John H. Watson, about the meeting of Sherlock Holmes and Tarzan. This was one of several works Farmer wrote that involved Tarzan.

Plot
The story is presented as a lost manuscript of Watson's, edited by Farmer. On orders from his older brother Mycroft, Sherlock Holmes and Dr. Watson travel to Africa and form an alliance with the titular peer, Lord Greystoke a.k.a. Tarzan to hunt down the nefarious Von Bork (from "His Last Bow") and stop his deadly new weapon.

Reissues
Due to copyright issues, it was rewritten as "The Adventure of the Three Madmen"—with Mowgli from The Jungle Book replacing Tarzan—in The Grand Adventure collection (1984). It was reissued by Titan Books in 2011 as part of The Further Adventures of Sherlock Holmes series. It has the abbreviated title of The Peerless Peer.

References

External links
The Peerless Peer at Titan Books

 Jungle brothers, or secrets of the jungle lords

1974 American novels
Adaptations of works by Edgar Rice Burroughs
Novels set in Africa
Novels by Philip José Farmer
Works based on Tarzan
Sherlock Holmes novels
Sherlock Holmes pastiches
Crossover novels
Wold Newton family